Jhaverchand or Zaverchand Kalidas Meghani ( – ) was an Indian poet, writer, social reformer and freedom fighter. He is a well-known name in the field of Gujarati literature.  He was born in Chotila where the Government College has been renamed for this literary figure as Raashtreeya Shaayar Zaverchand Meghani College, Chotila. Mahatma Gandhi spontaneously gave him the title of Raashtreeya Shaayar (National Poet). Besides this he received many awards like Ranjitram Suvarna Chandrak and Mahida Paaritoshik in literature. He authored more than 100 books. His first book was a translation work of Rabindranath Tagore's called Kathaa-u-Kaahinee titled Kurbani Ni Katha (Stories of martyrdom) which was first published in 1922. He contributed widely to Gujarati folk literature. He went from village to village in search of folk-lores and published them in various volumes of Saurashtra Ni Rasdhar. He was also the Editor of Phulchhab Newspaper of Janmabhoomi group (which is being published till date from Rajkot).

A sample of his collection of folk tales from Saurashtra has recently been published in English, with the translation done by his son Vinod Meghani. The three volumes published so far are titled A Noble Heritage, A Shade Crimson and The Ruby Shattered.

His poems are taught as a part of syllabus in Gujarat Board Schools (GSEB).

Life
Jhaverchand Meghani was born in Chotila, Gujarat to Kalidas and Dholima Meghani. His father Kalidas worked in the Police force and hence was often transferred to new places causing most of Jhaverchand's education to happen in Rajkot. He had two brothers Lalchand and Prabhashankar. He was married to a woman named Damyanti at the age of 24 and following the demise of his wife, he married Chitradevi at the age of 36. He had 9 children out of which 3 were girls namely Indu, Padmala and Murli, while 6 were boys, namely Mahendra, Mastan, Nanak, Vinod, Jayant and Ashok.

Early life

He lived a simple and sober life and his simplicity prompted his college mates to call him Raja Janak.

He habitually wore a white long coat, a dhoti reaching well down the knees and a turban typically tied around his head.
He finished his matriculation in 1912 and completed his BA in 1917. He started his career in Kolkata and joined Jeevanlal and Co. in 1918 as Personal Assistant and was fondly called Paghadee Babu by his colleagues and workers alike. He was soon promoted as the Manager of the company's factory at Belur, Crown Aluminium. In 1919, he went to England for a four-month tour. After coming back to India, he continued to work in Kolkata for 2 and half-years. Later, he returned to Saurashtra and joined the editorial board of the weekly Saurashtra at Rajkot in 1922.

Contribution to the freedom struggle

In 1930, he was sentenced to 2 years in jail for writing the book Sindhudo that contained songs to inspire the youth of India that was participating in the struggle for Independence against the British Raj. It is during this time that he wrote Kavya Triputi based on Gandhiji's visit to London for the Round Table conference. During this period, he also started writing short stories independently and served as editor for Phoolchaab magazine.

Publications

In 1926, he ventured into poetry with his book of children poems Veni Na Phool and started writing in Janmabhumi under the column Kalam Ane Kitaab. He established his reputation as a critic by his independent novels. In 1936, he became the editor of Phoolchaab. In 1942, he ventured into publishing with his book Marela Na Rudhir. In 1945, after retiring from Phoolchaab, he concentrated on personal writing. In 1946, his book Mansai Na Deeva was awarded the Mahida Award. The same year, he was elected to head the Gujarati Sahitya Parishad's Sahitya Section. In 1929, he gave 6 lectures for Gyan Prasarak Mandali. He also lectured at Santiniketan owing to his long association with Rabindranath Tagore. Meghani was also known as a Manbhatt poet due to his significant contribution to folk ballads. A movie song Man Mor Bani Thangat Kare in the 2013 Hindi film Goliyon Ki Raasleela Ram-Leela is written by him.

Folklores

 Doshi Ni Vato 

 Sorathi Baharvatiya 2
 Sorathi Baharvatiya 3-1929
 Saurashtra Ni Rasdhar 1
 Saurashtra Ni Rasdhar 2
 Saurashtra Ni Rasdhar 3
 Saurashtra Ni Rasdhar 4
 Saurashtra Ni Rasdhar 5
 Kankavati 1–1927
 Kankavati 2-1928
 Dadaji Ni Vato 
 Sorthi Santo-1928
 Sorthi Geetkathao-1931
 Puratan Jyot-1938
 Rang Che Barot-1945
 Loksahitya-1939
 Pagandino Panth-1942
 Charano Ane Charani-1943
 Dhartinu Dhavan-1944
 Loksahitya Nu Samalochan-1946

Poems

 Veni Na Phool-1927
 Killol-1930
 Sindhudo-1930
 
 Ektaro-1940
 Bapuna Parna-1943
 Ravindra Veena-1944
 Midnight Lace-1946
 Chaud Varsh ni Charan Kanya-1931
 Chello Katoro Jer no aa pi Jajo Bapu-1930-1932 (From Round Table Conference in London)

Folk Songs

 Radhiyali Raat 1–1925
 Radhiyali Raat 2-1925
 Radhiyali Raat 3-1927
 Radhiyali Raat 4-1942
 Chundadi 1–1928
 Chundadi 2-1929
 Rutugeeto-1929
 Halarda-1929
 Sorthi Santvani-1947
 Sorthiya Duha-1947

Drama

 Rano Pratap (Translation)-1923
 Raja Rani-1924
 Shah Jahan (Translation)-1927
 Vanthela-1933

Travelogue

 Saurashtrana Khandaroma-1928
 Sorathne Tire Tire-1933
 Parkamma-1946
 Chellu Prayan-1947

Short Stories

 Kurbani Ni Kathao-1922
 Chinta Na Angara 1–1931
 Chinta Na Angara 2-1932
 
 Dariyaparna Bahrvatiya-1932
 Pratimao-1932
 
 Dhup Chaya-1935
 Meghanini Navlikao 1 and 2-1942
 Vilopan-1946
 Anu nam te dhani

Novels

 
 ''Niranjan''
 ''Vasundharana Vahala Davla''
 ''Sorath, Tara Vaheta Pani''
 Samarangan-1928
 
 Vevishal
 ''Ra Gangajaliyo''-1
 ''Ra Gangajaliyo'' -2
 ''Bidela Dwar''
 Gujaratno Jay 1–1940
 Gujaratno Jay 2-1942
 Tulsi Kyaro-1940
 
 Kalchakra-1947
 Garvi Gujarat

Biography

 Annie Besant-1927
 Hungary no Taaranahaar-1927
 Narvir Lalaji-1927
 Satyavir Shradhdhanand-1927
 Sorathee Santo-1928
 Puraatan Jyot −1938
 Thakkar Bapa-1939
 Akbar Ni Yaadma-1942
 Aapnu Ghar-1942
 Panch Varas Na Pankhida-1942
 Marelana Rudhir-1942
 Aapna Gharni Vadhu Vato-1943
 Dayanand Sarasvati-1944
 
 Sant Deveedaas-1946
 Vasant-Rajab Smaarak Granth-1947

References

External links

 
 
 
 aksharnaad.com – Some of Shri Jhaverchand Meghani's works for free download as an ebook
 meghani.com – a Gujarati website principally aimed at providing information about Meghani's literary contributions
Zaverchand Meghani Books | Novel | Stories

Poets from Gujarat
Indian male poets
1896 births
1947 deaths
Gujarati-language writers
Gujarati-language poets
Indian independence activists from Gujarat
Indian social reformers
20th-century Indian poets
Prisoners and detainees of British India
People from Surendranagar district
People from Botad
Recipients of the Ranjitram Suvarna Chandrak
Indian historical novelists
20th-century Indian short story writers
20th-century Indian novelists
Novelists from Gujarat
20th-century Indian male writers
Translators of Rabindranath Tagore